Thadayam is a 1997 Tamil language action film directed by Ramesh Balakrishnan. The film stars Vijayashanti, Ramki and Indraja. It was released on 28 November 1997.

Plot

Chandrasekhar (Ramki), alias Chandru, is a graduate but he cannot find a job so he often goes to jail for earning a living. He lives with his friend Jeeva. Jothi (Vijayashanti), a fearless criminal lawyer, fights against injustice. Chandru falls in love with Devi (Indraja) while Jothi is in love with Chandru.

Cast

Vijayashanti as Advocate Jyothi
Ramki as Chandru (Chandrasekhar)
Indraja as Devi
Nagesh as Jyothi's Grandfather
Radha Ravi as Jyothi's father, Dhanashekar
Devan as Pandian, leader of a Rebel Group
Delhi Ganesh as Somu, Dhanashekar's PA
Rami Reddy as Jail Superintendent Pandidurai
Vadivelu as Neethidevan M.A., PA to advocate Jyothi
Uday Prakash as Jeeva, member of Pandian's group
Vinodhini as Jyothi
V. Gopalakrishnan
Alex
Mahanadi Shankar as Pandian's henchman
Jaguar Thangam
Chelladurai as Vadivelu
Vittal Rao
Idichapuli Selvaraj as Constable

Soundtrack

The film score and the soundtrack were composed by Deva. The soundtrack, released in 1997, features 5 tracks with lyrics written by Vaali, Ponniyin Selvan and Vaasan.

References

1997 films
Films scored by Deva (composer)
1990s Tamil-language films
Indian action films
Indian courtroom films
Films directed by Ramesh Balakrishnan
1997 action films